Aleksandar Nikolov (born 18 June 1992) is a Bulgarian swimmer. He competed in the men's 100 metre freestyle event at the 2016 Summer Olympics.

References

External links
 

1992 births
Living people
Bulgarian male freestyle swimmers
Olympic swimmers of Bulgaria
Swimmers at the 2016 Summer Olympics
Place of birth missing (living people)